Naudedrillia praetermissa is a species of sea snail, a marine gastropod mollusk in the family Pseudomelatomidae, the turrids and allies.

Description
The length of the shell varies between 15 mm and 20 mm.

Distribution
This marine species occurs off Mossel Bay, KwaZulu-Natal, South Africa

References

 Turton W.H. (1932). Marine Shells of Port Alfred, S. Africa. Humphrey Milford, London, xvi + 331 pp., 70 pls. page(s): 20, pl. 4 species 159
 Steyn, D.G. & Lussi, M. (1998) Marine Shells of South Africa. An Illustrated Collector’s Guide to Beached Shells. Ekogilde Publishers, Hartebeespoort, South Africa, ii + 264 pp. page(s): 152

External links
 Smith, E. A. "On a collection of marine shells from Port Alfred, Cape Colony." Journal of Malacology 11.2 (1904): 21-44 
 
 Gastropods.com: Naudedrillia praetermissa

Endemic fauna of South Africa
praetermissa
Gastropods described in 1904